Mirza Sadig Latifov (Azerbaijani: Mirzə Sadıq Mirzə Əbdüllətif oğlu Lətifov; b. April 19, 1852, Shusha, Russian Empire - 1901, Shusha, Russian Empire) was an Azerbaijani poet, doctor, teacher and member of the "Mejlisi Faramushan" literary society.

Life 
Mirza Sadig was born in 1852 in the city of Shusha. He belongs to the family of Latifovs known in Karabakh and Shusha. His father, Mirza Abdullatif, was a clergyman, teacher and calligrapher. His grandfather Molla Kelbali was one of the clerics close to the palace of Ibrahim Khalil Khan. Baba bey Shakir wrote about him in his poems and called him a scientist. Sadig received his primary education from his older brother, Molla Mehdigulu. He then went to Tabriz to continue his education. There he studied under the head physician Mirza Abdulhasan, one of the greatest scientists of that period. Then he continued his education with a German teacher. He completed his higher education and returned to Shusha. Mirza Sadig Latifov was engaged in medicine and teaching in Shusha. He treated the Khan's daughter Khurshidbanu Natavan and taught her children. He also worked as a Sharia teacher at the Shusha Realni School. One of his students was Yusif Vazir Chamanzaminli - famous Azerbaijani writer. Mirza Sadig was a poet and wrote poems under the pseudonyms "Tabib" and "Hijri". He was married to a woman named Gulbahar. They had sons Abdulhasan and Mahmud and a daughter, Zuleikha Khanym. Mirza Sadig Latifov died in 1901 and was buried at the Mirza Hassan Cemetery.
1852 births
1901 deaths
19th-century poets
19th-century educators
Azerbaijani poets
Azerbaijani educators
Azerbaijani-language poets
Writers from Shusha
Burials at Mirza Hassan Cemetery

References